Zentrale Bangkok was a German television series that starred Sabine Thiesler.

References

External links

1985 German television series debuts
1985 German television series endings
Television shows set in Bangkok
German-language television shows
Das Erste original programming